Pterostylis × aenigma, commonly known as enigmatic greenhood is a species of orchid endemic to Victoria. It has a rosette of leaves and a single green and white flower which leans forward and has a brownish point on the end. It is a rare orchid, occurring at only one site with fewer than 100 individual plants and is thought to be a natural hybrid between two species that grow nearby.

Description
The dorsal sepal and petals are joined and curve forward forming a hood over the column. The dorsal sepal is longer than the petals and has a pointed tip. The tip of the hood is brownish. There is a notch in the sinus between the lateral sepals and a large gap between the lateral sepals and petals. Flowering occurs between November and December.

Taxonomy and naming
Pterostylis × aenigma was first described in 1993 by David Jones and Mark Clements from a specimen collected near Omeo. The description was published in Muelleria. The authors noted that this species is possibly a hybrid between Pterostylis cucullata and P. furcata (later corrected to P. falcata), both of which grow nearby. The specific epithet (aenigma) means "riddle" or "mystery", referring to the "puzzling origin and distribution of this species".

Distribution and habitat
Enigmatic greenhood grows in moist places near streams in open forest at an altitude of  near Omeo.

Conservation
About 50 plants of Pterostylis × aenigma were known in 2003 but only five were located in 2005. The population occurs in the Alpine National Park but is nevertheless threatened by grazing, weed invasion and site disturbance. The species is classified as "Endangered"  by the Victorian Government and as "Endangered" (EN) under the Australian Government Environment Protection and Biodiversity Conservation Act 1999 (EPBC Act) and a recovery plan has been prepared.

References

x aenigma
Endemic orchids of Australia
Orchids of Victoria (Australia)
Plants described in 1993
Interspecific orchid hybrids